Luoxi Station is a metro station on Line 2 of the Guangzhou Metro. The underground station is located in Xinpu Road, Luoxi Island in the Panyu District of Guangzhou.

Neighboring Building  
 Luoxi New Town

Railway stations in China opened in 2010
Guangzhou Metro stations in Panyu District